"Dorobucci" is a song by The Mavins, a collective composed of Don Jazzy, Tiwa Savage, Dr SID, Reekado Banks, Korede Bello, Di'Ja and D'Prince. Released on May 1, 2014, it received generally positive reviews from music critics. Positive remarks went towards its production, instrumentation and composition. On the contrary, the music video received mixed reviews. While some critics described the video as brilliant, others felt it was dull and not up to par.

Background and music video 
"Dorobucci" was recorded in early 2014. Prior to revealing details about the song, Don Jazzy tagged several of his Instagram pictures with the hashtag "#Dorobucci". When the song was released, the uncertainty of its meaning made a few people labeled it as an occultic song. Don Jazzy has debunked the occultic reference made about the song. In May 2014, he said the latter part of the song means "anything that is fun, cool, awesome or fantastic."

Mavin Records' fans were given an opportunity to compete in the Channel O Mavin Super Fan competition, which required participants to explain why they are the ultimate Mavin fan. Participants were told to follow Channel O Africa on Twitter and Instagram; they were also told to add the "CHOMavinSuperfan" hashtag to their social media posts. On July 11, 2014, Don Jazzy announced Natalie Pitswe as the winner of the competition.

The music video for "Dorobucci" was shot and directed in South Africa by Nick Roux of Molotov Cocktail Productions. It was released on July 23, 2014, and uploaded to YouTube at an approximate length of 4 minutes. Pitswe made a cameo appearance in the video. The video portrayed The Mavins living a lavish lifestyle: exotic cars and Gatsby-style parties. There were shots of the Empire State Building and White House, as well as shots of a golf ball traveling from Ikoyi to Washington DC. The music video received mixed reviews from music critics. Although some saw it as a flop, others felt like it was top notch.

In popular culture
Tonto Dikeh released the D'banj-assisted track "Sugar Rush" on June 23, 2014. The song was criticized for sounding like "Dorobucci". A contestant on the seventh edition of Project Fame West Africa performed a humorous rendition of the song; a video of the contestant's performance went viral.

Critical reception
"Dorobucci" received mixed reviews from music critics. Chi Ibe of YNaija extensively said, "Dorobucci is an average song at best. It may well turn out to be one of Don Jazzy's biggest hits but it is certainly not one of his best, not by a long mile. The video has its bright spots. It looks expensive, with lots of colour, lots of class and images of the Mavin crew balling out of control. Everything is set to a maximum gloss but this cannot conceal the fact that it is a big bore." Akintayo Opeoluwani of The Daily Times of Nigeria criticized the song's lyrics and said that it could have been better with D'banj's vocals and wordplay.

Pulse Nigeria's Joey Akan described the song as a "mid-tempo feel-good song". Toni Kan of This Day said, "Dorobucci sounds like something you would hear from inebriated kegites on a lazy Friday night but the difference is that while the melody might sound commonplace, Don Jazzy has sprinkled his sound and song with the revitalizing ash of novelty thus elevating this simple ditty into a national anthem." Charles Novia criticized the video for lacking charisma and said it could have been better. Gbenga Adeniji of The Punch described the song as "funny, artistic and extensive".

Live performances
Dr SID and Tiwa Savage performed "Dorobucci" for the first time during Star Music Trek's visit to Ekwulobia in May 2014. On May 30, 2014, the aforementioned collective performed the song at the Road to the MAMAs concert.

Accolades
"Dorobucci" won Song of the Year at the MTV Africa Music Awards 2015. It won Best Pop Single and was nominated for Song of the Year at The Headies 2014. Moreover, it was nominated for Hottest Single of the Year at the 2015 Nigeria Entertainment Awards.

Covers and remixes
Digital download
"Dorobucci" (Dr SID and Don Jazzy Highlife version) - 3:56
"Dorobucci" (Sa'Shay cover) - 2:56
"House Of Ace" (Super Eagles cover) - 3:14
"Doro My People" (S Gee cover) - 5:16

Release history

References

External links

2014 songs
2014 singles
Don Jazzy songs
Tiwa Savage songs
Dr SID songs
Korede Bello songs
Song recordings produced by Don Jazzy
Songs written by Tiwa Savage
Mavin Records singles